Sadeh-Higlo sometimes spelled as Sadex-Higlo, Sadah-Higlo or Sadex Higla, is a town in the south-central Mudug region of Somalia. The town is located in the state of Galmudug, in the Galkayo District.

Location
Sadeh-Higlo is located 667 km from Mogadishu and 53 km from Gaalkacyo. The closest major town is Banderadley, which is 16.9 km away.

Sadeh-Higlo goes along the major road artery that connects the South of the country to the North.

Education
The town has 1 primary school called Sadeh-Higlo Primary School.

Health Care
Sadeh Higlo residents have access to Saddex Higlo General Hospital as their primary healthcare facility.

Security
The town has a police force and paramilitary that handle the basic security, law & order of the town and its surroundings. It also has a police training center and police station for the town. The police force consists of 40 officers and was founded by Colonel Abdi Jama Abdullahi Habeeb who is the Brig. General of  the Police Forces of Galmudug Security Force.

Climate
Sadeh Higlo has a desert climate (BSh) in Köppen-Geiger system. It receives little to no rainfall. The town has an average annual temperature of 27.3 °C with about 160 mm of rainfall annually.

References

External links

Populated places in Mudug
Populated places in Somalia
Cities in Somalia
Galmudug